Bon Voyage is a 1954 West German musical comedy film directed by Thomas Engel and starring Paul Hubschmid, Inge Egger and Paul Klinger.

The film's sets were designed by the art directors Emil Hasler and Walter Kutz. It was shot at the Tempelhof Studios in Berlin and on location in Hamburg and the Balearic Islands.

Plot 
Robert Langen and Lutz Steffens have a research job to do on the desert island of Formitosa in the South Seas, where they are getting bored over time. In order to combat their homesickness, they want to exchange letters with young women from their homeland and a short time later their advertisement appears in a Hamburg newspaper. It didn't take long before the two received the first letters. Lutz got mail from a Monika Brinkmann, while Robert's correspondent was called Eva Gordon. There was an Eva Gordon, but the letters were written by Monika on a whim, without Eva knowing anything about it. But then the two young scientists were called back to their institute in Hamburg for a short time. 

In a good mood, they go to the travel agency where Monika works as soon as they arrive. Robert's expectations were even exceeded, which is not surprising for a part-time photo model. Only Lutz is very irritated by Eva's reaction when he tracks her down. She puts a quick end to a first “approach” because Dr. Eva Gordon is engaged to her boss, the somewhat distracted mathematics professor van Mühlen, and the wedding is supposed to be the next day. Outraged, Eva goes to the police to report the misuse of her name and photo. Monika has no choice but to admit the fraud and apologize to Eva. In the meantime, she has found that the cheeky young man seems very amiable and that fate means well with her. After some small confusions, two couples in love travel to Formitosa.

Cast
 Paul Hubschmid as Robert Langen
 Inge Egger as Eva Gordon
 Paul Klinger as Mr. van Mühlen
 Peer Schmidt as Lutz Steffens
 Ina Peters as Monika Brinkmann
 Margarete Haagen as Mrs. van Mühlen
 Ernst Sattler as Onkel August
 Alfred Balthoff as Fotograf Lankwitz
 Emmy Burg as Tante Emilie
 Charles Hans Vogt as Barbier
 Ingrid Rentsch as Consuela, Barbier's wife
 Renate Feuereisen
 Kurt Vespermann
 Hans Hessling
 Walter Gross
 Eva Lissa
 Gerd Vespermann
 Ilse Abel
 Egon Brosig
 Fritz Grieb
 Paul Günther
 Wolfgang Kühne
 Annette Meilenthin
 Klaus Miedel
 Werner Schöne
 Jenie von Lossow
 Rieke Zbrzezny

References

External links 
 

1954 films
1954 musical comedy films
German musical comedy films
West German films
1950s German-language films
Films directed by Thomas Engel
Films based on operettas
Operetta films
German black-and-white films
Films shot at Tempelhof Studios
Films scored by Eduard Künneke
1950s German films